The 1987 New Brunswick general election was held on October 13, 1987, to elect 58 members to the 51st New Brunswick Legislative Assembly, the governing house of the province of New Brunswick, Canada. The Liberal Party won power for the first time since 1967.  They did so in a landslide, winning all 58 seats in the legislature. This feat was only accomplished one other time in Canadian history, in the 1935 Prince Edward Island election.

Background
The popularity of Richard Hatfield, who had served as a popular premier from 1970 through the 1982 election, fell due  to scandals in his last term. In 1984, during an official visit to New Brunswick by Queen Elizabeth II, Royal Canadian Mounted Police officers found marijuana in Hatfield's luggage.  Hatfield was later acquitted of marijuana possession charges. As reported by the media, Hatfield was also alleged to have hosted parties with young men where illegal drugs were used. He was criticized by opposition parties and by the media for extravagant use of the government plane, which he used to travel to New York City where he  visited night clubs, earning him the nickname "Disco Dick".

In 1985, three Saint John-area Progressive Conservative members of the legislature (MLAs) challenged Hatfield's leadership and led a brief caucus revolt after the Liberals won two by-elections in previously Tory seats, but Hatfield  led the party through a fifth election.

Campaign
Hoping to boost his popularity enough to avoid defeat, Hatfield delayed calling the election as long as possible.  It was finally held on October 13, 1987, five years and a day since the last election—the longest allowed by the Constitution of Canada.  The Tories lost all of their seats, and Hatfield himself lost his own seat to Liberal challenger Allison DeLong by 19 points.  Taking full responsibility for the defeat, he announced his resignation the night of the election while being interviewed by media outside of his Hartland home.  Tory supporters had crowded into Hatfield's home, but abandoned him early in the evening as the returns began to come in.

Frank McKenna's Liberals were virtually assured victory from day one, thanks to Hatfield's scandals.  However, they ran a very successful campaign that enabled them to garner an unprecedented clean sweep of the legislature.  The New Democrats also suffered a moral defeat, losing their one seat—something they had won for the first time in 1982.

Results

Results by riding

North 

Consisting of Victoria, Madawaska, Restigouche and Gloucester county ridings.

|-
|bgcolor=whitesmoke|Victoria-Tobique
||
|Dr. Larry R. Kennedy 3,787
|
|J. Douglas Moore 2,126
|
|Evelyn Hathaway 372
|
|
||
|J. Douglas Moore
|-
|bgcolor=whitesmoke|Grand Falls
||
|Paul E. Duffie 4,124
|
|Réal Dionne 997
|
|Henri Soucy 224
|
|
||
|Everard Daigle†
|-
|bgcolor=whitesmoke|Madawaska-les-Lacs
||
|Georges Corriveau 3,839
|
|Jean-Pierre Ouellet 1,933
|
|Maurice Clavette 368
|
|
||
|Jean-Pierre Ouellet
|-
|bgcolor=whitesmoke|Madawaska Centre
||
|Gérald Clavette 3,136
|
|Don Marmen 1,759
|
|Paul Morneault 386
|
|
||
|Gérald Clavette
|-
|bgcolor=whitesmoke|Edmundston
||
|Roland Beaulieu 4,526
|
|J. Pius Bard 1,387
|
|Rodolphe Martin 394
|
|
||
|Roland Beaulieu
|-
|bgcolor=whitesmoke|Madawaska South
||
|Pierrette Ringuette 2,597
|
|Percy P. Mockler 2,272
|
|Jean-Claude Bosse 131
|
|
||
|Percy P. Mockler
|-
|bgcolor=whitesmoke|Restigouche West
||
|Jean-Paul Savoie 3,479
|
|Yvon Poitras 3,462
|
|James Gallant 262
|
|
||
|Yvon Poitras
|-
|bgcolor=whitesmoke|Campbellton
||
|Edmond Blanchard 4,278
|
|Fernand G. Dubé 2,244
|
|Clara I. MacMillan 362
|
|
||
|Fernand G. Dubé
|-
|bgcolor=whitesmoke|Dalhousie
||
|Allan Maher 4,479
|
|Scott Chedore 919
|
|Stewart Beckingham 380
|
|
||
|Allan Maher
|-
|bgcolor=whitesmoke|Restigouche East
||
|Rayburn Doucett 3,382
|
|Paul E. McIntyre 1,599
|
|Wayne Lapointe 190
|
|
||
|Rayburn Doucett
|-
|bgcolor=whitesmoke|Nigadoo-Chaleur
||
|Pierre Godin 5,953
|
|Annonciade "Nancy" Arsenault 1,478
|
|John Gagnon 595
|
|
||
|Pierre Godin
|-
|bgcolor=whitesmoke|Nepisiguit-Chaleur
||
|Frank Branch 5,086
|
|Claude Albert 1,029
|
|Harry Scott 323
|
|
||
|Frank Branch
|-
|bgcolor=whitesmoke|Bathurst
||
|Paul Kenny 6,281
|
|René Pratt 1,126
|
|Richard Doucet 566
|
|
||
|Paul Kenny
|-
|bgcolor=whitesmoke|Caraquet
||
|Bernard Thériault 5,642
|
|Emery Robichaud 4,508
|
|Gérard Rousselle 171
|
|
||
|Emery Robichaud
|-
|bgcolor=whitesmoke|Shippagan-les-Îles
||
|Aldéa Landry 5,601
|
|Jean Gauvin 3,993
|
|Charles Rail 100
|
|
||
|Jean Gauvin
|-
|bgcolor=whitesmoke|Tracadie
||
|Douglas M. Young 5,787
|
|Colette McGraw 3,081
|
|Serge Robichaud 823
|
|Fernand Losier (Ind.) 184
||
|Douglas M. Young
|}

Central 
Consisting of Carleton, York, Sunbury and Northumberland county ridings.

|-
|bgcolor=whitesmoke|Carleton North
||
|B. Fred Harvey 2,687
|
|Charles G. Gallagher 1,963
|
|Anna Marie Kilfoil 217
|
|
||
|Charles G. Gallagher
|-
|bgcolor=whitesmoke|Carleton Centre
||
|Allison Winston DeLong 2,787
|
|Richard B. Hatfield 1,853
|
|Kathryn Campbell 183
|
|
||
|Richard B. Hatfield
|-
|bgcolor=whitesmoke|Carleton South
||
|Bruce Smith 3,059
|
|Steven Porter 2,032
|
|Arthur L. Slipp 303
|
|
||
|Steven Porter
|-
|bgcolor=whitesmoke|York North
||
|Bob Simpson 6,221
|
|David Bishop 2,714
|
|Craig Melanson 1,075
|
|
||
|David Bishop
|-
|bgcolor=whitesmoke|York South
||
|Al Lacey 6,894
|
|Les Hull 3,485
|
|Gary Hughes 1,002
|
|H. Robert A. Storr (Ind.) 108
||
|Les Hull
|-
|bgcolor=whitesmoke|Fredericton South
||
|Russ King 7,384
|
|David Clark 2,672
|
|Shauna MacKenzie 2,323
|
|Harry John Marshall (Ind.) 116
||
|David Clark
|-
|bgcolor=whitesmoke|Fredericton North
||
|Jim Wilson 6,667
|
|Ed Allen 3,584
|
|Carman J. Burns 888
|
|Gordon "Brian" King (Ind.) 354
||
|Ed Allen
|-
|bgcolor=whitesmoke|Sunbury
||
|Doug Harrison 4,551
|
|Horace Smith 1,917
|
|Christina Corey 569
|
|
||
|Horace Smith
|-
|bgcolor=whitesmoke|Oromocto
||
|Tom Gilbert 3,807
|
|Joe Mombourquette 1,377
|
|Barbara Carr 436
|
|
||
|Joe Mombourquette
|-
|bgcolor=whitesmoke|Southwest Miramichi
||
|Morris Green 4,676
|
|Kevin Price 1,390
|
|Patrick Kelly 180
|
|Burton Joseph Kehoe (Ind.) 70
||
|Morris Green
|-
|bgcolor=whitesmoke|Miramichi-Newcastle
||
|John McKay 4,120
|
|Paul Dawson 3,334
|
|Jeanne Theriault 214
|
|
||
|Paul Dawson
|-
|bgcolor=whitesmoke|Chatham
||
|Frank McKenna 4,653
|
|Leon Bremner 1,044
|
|Patricia Marie Clancy 248
|
|
||
|Frank McKenna
|-
|bgcolor=whitesmoke|Bay du Vin
||
|Reg MacDonald 3,026
|
|Roger "Butch" Wedge 2,460
|
|Yvon Roy 130
|
|
||
|Butch Wedge
|-
|bgcolor=whitesmoke|Miramichi Bay
||
|Donald "Danny" Gay 4,422
|
|James K. "Jim" Gordon 2,575
|
|Joyce Carter 154
|
|
||
|Jim Gordon
|}

South West 
Consisting of Queens, Kings, Saint John and Charlotte county ridings.

|-
|bgcolor=whitesmoke|Queens North
||
|Doug Tyler 2,212
|
|Constance M. Webber 1,442
|
|Ruth Nightingale 135
|
|
||
|Wilfred Bishop†
|-
|bgcolor=whitesmoke|Queens South
||
|Vaughn Blaney 2,075
|
|Robert B. McCready 1,296
|
|Susan Barton 256
|
|
||
|Robert B. McCready
|-
|bgcolor=whitesmoke|Kings West
||
|Laureen Jarrett 6,717
|
|Don Horne 2,811
|
|George Little 4,397
|
|
||
|John B. M. Baxter, Jr.†
|-
|bgcolor=whitesmoke|Kings Centre
||
|Dr. Kal Seaman 4,419
|
|Harold Newton Fanjoy 2,426
|
|Marian G. Jefferies 1,392
|
|Calvert M. "Colby" Fraser (Ind.) 403Edward Freeman Gaunce (Ind.) 31
||
|Harold Newton Fanjoy
|-
|bgcolor=whitesmoke|Kings East
||
|P.A. "Pete" Dalton 4,662
|
|Hazen Myers 2,737
|
|Mark Dibblee Connell 815
|
|
||
|Hazen Myers
|-
|bgcolor=whitesmoke|Saint John Fundy
||
|Stuart Jamieson 2,724
|
|Bev Harrison 2,399
|
|Ben Donaldson 1,459
|
|
||
|Bev Harrison
|-
|bgcolor=whitesmoke|East Saint John
||
|Peter Trites 3,746
|
|Gary William Woodroffe 1,737
|
|Ervan Cronk 2,976
|
|Dolores H. Cook (Ind.) 375Frank Brown (Ind.) 272
||
|Peter Trites
|-
|bgcolor=whitesmoke|Saint John Harbour
||
|Louis Murphy 2,705
|
|Gay Wittrien 830
|
|Kenneth Wilcox 768
|
|
||
|Louis Murphy
|-
|bgcolor=whitesmoke|Saint John South
||
|John Mooney 1,974
|
|Nancy Teed 1,133
|
|David Brown 1,416
|
|
||
|Nancy Teed
|-
|bgcolor=whitesmoke|Saint John Park
||
|Shirley Dysart 2,596
|
|Jean Porter 820
|
|Paul Allen Maccovour 979
|
|
||
|Shirley Dysart
|-
|bgcolor=whitesmoke|Saint John North
||
|Leo A. McAdam 2,753
|
|Eric John Kipping 1,165
|
|Lesley Orill MacLean 952
|
|
||
|Eric John Kipping
|-
|bgcolor=whitesmoke|Saint John West
||
|Jane Barry 4,208
|
|G. M. Keith Dow 3,057
|
|Bob Jones 1,574
|
|
||
|G. M. Keith Dow
|-
|bgcolor=whitesmoke|Charlotte-Fundy
||
|Eric Allaby 2,475
|
|James Nelson Tucker 1,340
|
|Dorothy Matthews 220
|
|
||
|James Nelson Tucker
|-
|bgcolor=whitesmoke|Charlotte Centre
||
|Sheldon Lee 2,431
|
|Stanley J. Smith 765
|
|Graham Richardson 133
|
|
||
|Sheldon Lee
|-
|bgcolor=whitesmoke|Charlotte West
||
|Reid Hurley 2,286
|
|Leland W. McGaw 1,434
|
|Ray "Bud" Parks 211
|
|
||
|Leland W. McGaw
|-
|bgcolor=whitesmoke|St. Stephen-Milltown
||
|Ann Breault 2,054
|
|Bob Jackson 1,922
|
|Rick MacMillan 132
|
|C. Ronald Campbell (Ind.) 21
||
|Bob Jackson
|}

South East 
Consisting of Kent, Westmorland and Albert county ridings.

|-
|bgcolor=whitesmoke|Kent North
||
|Conrad Landry 3,697
|
|Gérald Guimond 1,414
|
|Charles Richard 416
|
|
||
|Conrad Landry
|-
|bgcolor=whitesmoke|Kent Centre
||
|Alan R. Graham 3,232
|
|Sammy Arsenault 662
|
|Neil Gardner 268
|
|
||
|Alan R. Graham
|-
|bgcolor=whitesmoke|Kent South
||
|Camille Thériault 5,546
|
|Omer Léger 3,242
|
|Gérald Mazerolle 522
|
|
||
|Omer Léger
|-
|bgcolor=whitesmoke|Shediac
||
|Azor LeBlanc 7,219
|
|Allard Robichaud 2,087
|
|Omer W. Bourgue 858
|
|
||
|Azor LeBlanc
|-
|bgcolor=whitesmoke|Tantramar
||
|Marilyn Trenholme 3,160
|
|Lloyd Folkins 1,085
|
|Robert Arthur Hall 1,825
|
|
||
|Robert Arthur Hall
|-
|bgcolor=whitesmoke|Memramcook
||
|Greg O'Donnell 5,220
|
|Clarence Cormier 2,914
|
|Claire Doiron 932
|
|
||
|Clarence Cormier
|-
|bgcolor=whitesmoke|Moncton East
||
|Ray Frenette 5,131
|
|David Cutler 1,114
|
|Raymond Boucher 1,046
|
|
||
|Ray Frenette
|-
|bgcolor=whitesmoke|Moncton North
||
|Mike McKee 6,570
|
|Stephen M. Trueman 1,083
|
|Chris Collins 1,099
|
|
||
|Mike McKee
|-
|bgcolor=whitesmoke|Moncton West
||
|Jim Lockyer 4,853
|
|Mabel DeWare 1,916
|
|David Lang 786
|
|
||
|Mabel DeWare
|-
|bgcolor=whitesmoke|Petitcodiac
||
|Hollis S. Steeves 7,081
|
|C.W. "Bill" Harmer 3,833
|
|Richard James Hay 2,368
|
|
||
|Bill Harmer
|-
|bgcolor=whitesmoke|Riverview
||
|Hubert Seamans 5,357
|
|Dave Richardson 2,002
|
|Terry Boudreau 814
|
|
||
|Hubert Seamans
|-
|bgcolor=whitesmoke|Albert
||
|Harold A. Terris 2,668
|
|Malcolm MacLeod 1,818
|
|Eugene R. Marshall 765
|
|
||
|Malcolm MacLeod
|}

References

Sources
 

1987 elections in Canada
Elections in New Brunswick
1987 in New Brunswick
October 1987 events in Canada